Curling has been a part of the Winter Universiade since it was featured was optional sport in the 2003 Winter Universiade in Tarvisio. It became a compulsory sport as of the 2007 Winter Universiade in Turin.

Medal winners

Woman's Tournaments

Men's Tournaments

Medal table 
Last updated after the 2023 Winter Universiade

References
Sports123

 
Sports at the Winter Universiade
Universiade